Leisler may refer to:

People
 Jacob Leisler (c. 1640–1691) was a German-born colonist of New York
 Johann Philipp Achilles Leisler (c. 1771–1813), German physician and naturalist

Animals
 Leisler's bat (Nyctalus leisleri)

See also
 Leisler's Rebellion